Transcultural may refer to:

Transcultural psychiatry, also known as Cross-cultural psychiatry
Transculturation, the phenomenon of merging and converging cultures
Transculturalism
Trans-cultural diffusion